Athena Bryana "Athena" Delgado Tolentino (born June 11, 1998) is a Filipino politician serving as the vice governor of Cavite since 2022. She previously served as a city councilor of Tagaytay from 2019 to 2022. She is the daughter of Tagaytay mayor Abraham Tolentino and Tagaytay vice mayor Agnes Tolentino and niece of current senator Francis Tolentino.

References

1998 births
Living people
Politicians from Cavite
National Unity Party (Philippines) politicians